Risto Bimbiloski (born in 1975 in Macedonia) is a Macedonian fashion designer based in Paris, founder and creative director of Risto. He defines his style as Acidchique.

Biography
A graduate of Ecole Duperré, Risto Bimbiloski started his career at Jean Colonna and Thierry Mugler. He showed his first collection at Hyères International Fashion Festival.

Risto Bimbiloski created the Risto brand as a handcrafted knitwear collection. His atelier started with four knitting artisans.

Risto Bimbiloski worked at Louis Vuitton (menswear knitwear), Kenzo with Humberto Leon & Carol Lim and Maison Margiela. Celebrities such as Katy Perry, Maggie Gyllenhaal, Rowan Blanchard, Santigold, or Courtney Love wore Risto.

Tavi Gevinson selected Risto among the world's most significant and groundbreaking contemporary designers for the book Pattern (Phaidon Press Ltd). Risto products were distributed in 50 stores in the USA, Europe, and Asia.

Sources

Bibliography
Book : Pattern (Phaidon Press Ltd) —

External links

 Interview by Amica.it

Macedonian fashion designers
1975 births
Living people
Macedonian emigrants to France
French people of Macedonian descent